This is a list of television stations in Norway.

Terrestrial channels 
These channels are available as  via cable and satellite systems. The Norwegian analogue terrestrial net is closed and replaced with a digital net. The NRK channels are open, the other channels are encrypted and subscriptions are sold by www.rikstv.no

Cable and satellite television

Norsk Rikskringkasting

NRK1
NRK2
NRK3 (Youth channel)
NRK Super  (Children channel)
NRK Tegnspråk (Television channel for those with a hearing impairment. This channel adapts shows from the other national channels, so that they are appropriate for those with hearing loss, for example by adding sign language and/or subtitles)
NRK1 HD simulcast of NRK1
NRK2 HD simulcast of NRK2
NRK3 HD simulcast of NRK3

TV 2

TV 2
TV 2 HD - High-definition simulcast of TV 2
TV 2 Nyheter (news channel)
TV 2 Sport (sports channel)
TV 2 Sport 1
TV 2 Sport 2
TV 2 Sport Premium 1
TV 2 Sport Premium 2
TV 2 Zebra (youth programs, interactive programs and live sports)
TV 2 Livsstil (lifestyle)

TV4 AB/C More Entertainment

C More First
C More Hits
C More Series
C More Stars
C More Live
C More Live 2
C More Live 3
C More Live 4
SF-kanalen
TV4 Fakta

Viaplay Group/MTG

TV3 (general entertainment)
TV3+ (general entertainment)
TV6 (planned)
V Film (movies)
V Film Premiere
V Film Action
V Film Hits
V Film Family
V Series
V Sport
V Sport +
V Sport 1
V Sport 2
V Sport 3
V Sport Golf
V Sport Live
V Sport Premier League
V Sport Ultra

Warner Bros. Discovery Norway

TVNorge (general entertainment)
TVNorge HD (Simulcast of TVNorge)
FEM (Women's channel)
MAX (Men's channel)
VOX (Adult/"Grown ups" channel)
Discovery Channel
Discovery HD
Eurosport Norge
TLC Norway

Others

VGTV, owned by Schibsted Norge AS
Matkanalen, owned by Schibsted Norge AS
Canal Motor, owned by Intele, programs about racing, cars, motorcycles & Motors
Rikstoto Direkte, owned by Norsk Rikstoto, horse racing
Verdikanalen (general/religious)web link
Visjon Norge (religious), owned by iVisjon web link
tvins (home shopping), owned by Thane Direct
TV Glad
Fatstone.TV, (Fatstone Media AS) Norwegian owned, Outdoor and Action sports channel

Transnational television channels

Localised and non-localised versions

BBC Studios
BBC Brit (Replaced by BBC Entertainment on April 13, 2015).
BBC Earth, documentary channel

AMC Networks International
CBS Reality
Extreme Sports Channel

The Walt Disney Company
Disney Channel Scandinavia
Disney Junior Scandinavia
National Geographic Channel Scandinavia
National Geographic Channel HD
National Geographic Wild

Playboy Enterprises
The Adult Channel
Playboy TV
Spice Network

Warner Bros. Discovery EMEA
Animal Planet (Nordic)
Boomerang (Nordic)
Cartoon Network (Nordic)
Discovery Science
Eurosport 1
Eurosport 2
Investigation Discovery

Paramount Networks EMEAA
MTV Europe
Club MTV
MTV 80s
MTV 90s
MTV 00s
MTV Hits
MTV Live
Nickelodeon (Scandinavia)
Nick Jr. (Scandinavia)
Nicktoons (Scandinavia)

Viasat World
Viasat Explore
Viasat History
Viasat Nature

A+E Networks
History
History HD
H2

Others 
Bloomberg TV, owned by Michael Bloomberg
CNBC Nordic, owned by NBCUniversal
E!, owned by Comcast, news and programs about the entertainment industry
The God Channel
God 2
Motors TV
Penthouse TV
Private Blue
The Poker Channel
Travel Channel, owned by Warner Bros. Discovery

Non-localised versions 
Channels shown in their original format, without local subtitles or local audio.
3ABN International
3sat
BBC World News
BEN Television
Chelsea TV
Club - Entertainment for women
CNN International - 24/7 News channel owned by Warner Bros. Discovery
DR1
Euronews
Fashion TV
Fox News Channel
Health Channel
Hope Channel International
Life TV
Liverpool TV
Mezzo TV
Motors TV
MUTV
RTL
Sat1
Sky News - 24/7 News channel owned by Comcast
Sony Entertainment Television Asia
SVT1 – See also Sveriges Television
SVT2 – See also Sveriges Television
Rai Uno
TBN Europe
TV2
TV4
TV5Monde
TV8
TVE Internacional
TV Finland
TRT World
 Wonderful - Religious channel
Zee TV

Other channels

Defunct television channels 
 3+ - General entertainment channel (1 July 1996 - 1 October 1996)
 BBC Entertainment (Replaced BBC Prime on December 1, 2008).
 BBC Food - Food channel Merged with BBC Lifestyle (2004–2008)
 BBC Prime - Entertainment channel replaced by BBC Entertainment (???? - 2008)
 BBC HD, High Definition television channel.
 Canal 9 (2011–2014)
 C More Film - Movie channel (2004–2006)
 C More Film 2 - Movie channel (2004–2006)
 C More Emotion
 C More Extreme
 C More Sport HD (sports in high-definition)
 C More Tennis
 Canal+ Comedy (2006–2010)
 Canal+ Action
 Canal+ Drama
 Canal+ Family
 Canal+ Emotion
 Canal+ Film HD (high-definition movies)
 Canal+ Fotball
 Canal+ Sport 2
 Canal+ Sport 3
 Canal+ Hockey
 Canal+ Sport Extra
 Canal+ Sport HD (sports in high-definition)
 Canal M - Shopping channel (1998–1999)
 Cinema 1 - Movie Channel (1995–2004)
 Cinema 2 - Timeshift channel for Cinema 1 (2002–2004)
 Cinema 3 - Timeshift channel for Cinema 2 (2002–2004)
 FOX - general entertainment
 Fox Crime
 Disney XD Scandinavia - Children's channel (2009–2020)
 Discovery World - Documentary channel (1998–2020)
 ESPN America - Sports channel
 ESPN Classic - Sports classic channel
 Fight+ - Combat Sports channel (March, 2006 - December, 2006)
 FilmMax - Movie Channel (???? - 1995)
 FilmNet 1 - Movie Channel (1985–1996) (See Canal+)
 FilmNet 2 - Movie Channel (1985–1996)
 Fox Kids Nordic - Children's channel (1998–2004) (changed name to Jetix, see below)
 Hallmark Channel Scandilux - Movie channel (1996–2009)
 Janco Visjon - General entertainment channel (1986–1987)
 Jetix Scandinavia - Children's channel (2004–2009) (replaced by Disney XD)
 Kiosk - 8 pay-per-view channels (1997–2007)
 Metropol TV - Youth-oriented entertainment channel (1999–2002)
 Moox Live - Youth channel with user-generated content (December, 2006 - August, 2007)
 Norsk TV1 - General entertainment channel (1987–1990) (Merged with TVNorge)
 Nyhetskanalen - News channel (1997–1998)
 The Studio - Movie channel (2001–2003)
 Rush HD
 Showtime Scandinavia - Action and horror movies
 Silver - Independent Movies
 Sportkanalen - Sports channel (1996–1997)
 Star! Scandinavia
 SuperSport - Sports channel (1995–1997) (compare now Canal+ Sport)
 Turner Classic Movies - Movie Channel
 Toon Disney Scandinavia - Children's channel (2005–2009) (replaced by Disney XD)
 TV+ - General entertainment channel (1994–1995)
 TV 2 Filmkanalen (movies) (2006–2015)
 TV 2 Science Fiction (Science fiction)(Web-TV channel) (2009–2011)
 TV 2 Sonen 24/7 - Interactive television channel (March, 2007 - July, 2007)
 TV4 Norge - General entertainment channel (1990–1992)
 TV6 - Women's channel (1994–1998) (Replaced with TV6 Nature World/TV6 Action World)
 TV1000 2 - Timeshift channel for TV1000 (2002–2004)
 TV1000 3 - Timeshift channel for TV1000 (2002–2004)
 VH1 - Music channel
 VH1 Classic - Music channel
 Viasat Film Comedy
 Viasat Fotball
 Viasat Hockey
 Viasat Motor
 Viasat Plus - General entertainment channel (2000–2002)
 Viasat SportN - Sports channel  (2005–2009) (replaced by Viasat Fotball)
 Viasat Sport 2 - Soccer channel (2004–2008)
 Viasat Sport 3 - Action sports channel (2004–2008)
 Viasat Sport 24 - Sports channel (2005–2007)
 Viasat Ticket (pay-per-view)
 Voom HD International - General enteraiment channel (2005–2009)
 ZTV Norway - Youth channel (2002 - September 5, 2007)

Channels with former names
Canal+ Gul now Canal+ First
Canal+ Blå now Canal+ Hits
Canal+ Zap now Canal+ Sport
C More HD now Canal+ HD
Canal+ now Canal+ Drama
TV 2 Bliss now TV 2 Livsstil
Canal+ now C More
TV 2 Premier League now TV 2 Sport Premium
TV 2 Nyhetskanalen now TV 2 Nyheter

See also 
 Television in Norway

References

 Stations
Norway
Television stations
Stations